Rui Pedro Correia Nunes (born 7 January 1990), known as Ruca, is a Portuguese footballer who plays as a goalkeeper.

Club career
Born in Tábua, Coimbra District, Ruca all but spent his entire senior career in the Portuguese lower leagues. In early February 2015, he signed a five-month contract with Segunda Liga club Académico de Viseu F.C. from A.D. Nogueirense, making his debut in the competition on 15 April in a 0–0 home draw against FC Porto B.

Ruca returned to the third division in the summer of 2016, joining Lusitano FCV in the same region.

References

External links

Portuguese League profile 

1990 births
Living people
People from Tábua
Sportspeople from Coimbra District
Portuguese footballers
Association football goalkeepers
Liga Portugal 2 players
Segunda Divisão players
G.D. Tourizense players
Padroense F.C. players
C.S. Marítimo players
A.D. Nogueirense players
Académico de Viseu F.C. players
Lusitano FCV players
F.C. Oliveira do Hospital players
Portugal youth international footballers